The Mt. Beacon Fire Observation Tower is located on the summit of South Beacon Mountain in Beacon, New York, United States.

It was added to the National Register of Historic Places in 2009.

See also
National Register of Historic Places listings in Dutchess County, New York

References

External links

The Fire Towers of New York

Government buildings on the National Register of Historic Places in New York (state)
Buildings and structures in Dutchess County, New York
Fire lookout towers on the National Register of Historic Places in New York (state)
National Register of Historic Places in Dutchess County, New York